Warren is a city in and the county seat of Marshall County, Minnesota, United States. The population was 1,605 at the 2020 census.

History
Warren was platted in 1879, and named for Charles H. Warren, a railroad official. A post office has been in operation at Warren since 1880.

Although several times larger than the next largest city in the county, Warren's prominence as the county seat has been threatened several times in its history.  The original plan for the Soo Line Railroad (completed in 1905) branch line that passes through Warren called for it to run from Thief River Falls to Argyle and then west.  Argyle interests hoped the establishment of a railroad junction there would lead to the removal of the county seat from Warren to Argyle.  Other interests prevailed, although the railroad line forms a parabola extending north from Thief River Falls, and then south to Warren, as if the plan changed while the line was being built.  In 1974, citizens of the eastern part of the county, noting Warren's location in the western quarter of the long county, and very nearly at its southern boundary, petitioned twice for the relocation of the county seat to Newfolden.  Neither effort that year resulted in the question being put on the ballot, and in fact, voters in the interim had approved the construction of an addition to the courthouse in Warren.

Warren was featured on a 2006 episode of the History Channel's UFO Files episode "Alien Encounters." The unsolved case of a mysterious object impacting a county sheriff's car on August 27, 1979 was featured (see Val Johnson Incident). This same case was also featured in 2012 on the Travel Channel's Mysteries at the Museum episode "MGM Fire; UFO Car, Prophecy Sword"

Geography
The Snake River flows in serpentine fashion through the city (hence its name), and both banks are developed, which has proved problematic as the city attempts flood control. Some major floods in the city's history took place in 1896 (twice), 1969, 1974, 1979, 1996 (twice), and 1997.

The streets of the original townsite of Warren are laid out on a grid parallel and perpendicular to the Burlington Northern Santa Fe Railroad.  Some newer additions, particularly those south of Bridge Street (Minnesota Highway 1) are laid out on a conventional north-south grid. The BNSF is the dividing line for the street system east and west, and Bridge Street is the dividing line north and south.

U.S. Highway 75 and Minnesota State Highway 1 are two of the main routes in the city.

Climate

Demographics

2010 census
As of the census of 2010, the city had 1,563 people, 681 households, and 743 families. The racial makeup of the city was 97.2% White, 0.4% African American, 0.3% Native American, 0.3% Asian, 1.2% from other races, and 0.5% from two or more races. Hispanic or Latino of any race were 2.6% of the population.

Of the 681 households, 27.8% had children under 18 years, 46.1% were married couples living together, 10.7% had a female householder with no husband present, 4.6% had a male householder with no wife present, and 38.6% were non-families. 35.7% of all households were made up of individuals, and 18.5% had someone living alone who was 65 years or older. The average household size was 2.20 and the average family size was 2.82.

The median age in the city was 44.5 years. 23.2% of residents were under the age of 18; 6.3% were between the ages of 18 and 24; 21.2% were from 25 to 44; 25.7% were from 45 to 64; and 23.5% were 65 years of age or older. The gender makeup of the city was 47.5% male and 52.5% female.

2000 census
As of the 2000 census, 1,678 people, 699 households, and 432 families were in the city. The racial makeup of the city was 98.27% White, 0.12% African American, 0.24% Native American, 0.06% Asian, 1.01% from other races, and 0.30% from two or more races. Hispanic or Latino of any race were 2.62% of the population.

Of the 699 households, 28.8% had children under 18 years, 49.6% were married couples living together, 9.9% had a female householder with no husband present, and 38.1% were non-families. 35.9% of all households were made up of individuals, and 20.6% had someone living alone who was 65 years of age or older.  The average household size was 2.24 and the average family size was 2.90.

In the city, the population was spread out, with 23.4% under the age of 18, 6.6% from 18 to 24, 24.2% from 25 to 44, 21.1% from 45 to 64, and 24.7% who were 65 years of age or older.  The median age was 42 years. For every 100 females, there were 88.1 males.  For every 100 females age 18 and over, there were 83.0 males.

The median income for a household in the city was $36,250 and the median income for a family was $45,063. Males had a median income of $32,216 versus $20,625 for females. The per capita income for the city was $17,547.  About 6.5% of families and 10.2% of the population were below the poverty line, including 11.5% of those under age 18 and 10.6% of those age 65 or over.

Religion
The city has three Lutheran churches (two affiliated with the Evangelical Lutheran Church in America and one affiliated with the Lutheran Church–Missouri Synod), a Roman Catholic parish and cemetery, an Evangelical Covenant church, a United Methodist church, and an Assembly of God church, as well as a non-denominational church. In the rural area surrounding the city, there are three small Lutheran churches.

Economy
Agriculture and agribusiness have been the mainstays of Warren throughout its history.  In fact, for most of its history, there has been no other industry at all. Although the Red River Valley has a short growing season, which is often made even shorter due to floods, the area has excellent crop yields which help make farming in the area less risky than in other areas with poorer soil.  The principal crops are wheat, soybeans, potatoes, and sugar beets.  Warren was at one time home to the largest independent elevator in Minnesota.  Northwest Grain Cenex Harvest States Cooperative has a large elevator on the Soo Line, and the American Crystal Sugar Co. operates a sugar beet terminal just north of Warren during harvest.  Warren has three bank branches, the largest being a branch of Community Bank of the Red River Valley, headquartered in East Grand Forks.

Education and culture
Warren is home of the Warren-Alvarado-Oslo school district.  The district has one six-year high school and one elementary school, both located in Warren.  Both buildings have been called superior facilities for a district its size.  The high school, built in 1954, includes a 1000-seat auditorium.  The elementary school, built in 1970, was originally an "open school" design where the classrooms were separated by chalkboard partitions rather than walls, although a few walls were installed in 1987. In the late 2000s, the school board went on to add on a new gymnasium.

Warren has a public library, the Godel Memorial Library, and is home to the Marshall County Historical Society, the Marshall County Fair, and the Warren Riverside Country Club (9-hole, par 4, grass greens).

Transportation
The Warren City Council voted to build an airport in 1965 for an estimated cost of $109,000. A dedication ceremony took place in August 1966.

Notable people
Some notable people who have lived in Warren:
 Julius J. Olson – Minnesota Supreme Court justice and chief justice
 Oscar Knutson – Minnesota Supreme Court chief justice
 John J. Herrick – captain who led the craft fired upon in the Gulf of Tonkin incident
 Gerome Kamrowski – abstract painter
 Joseph Steffan – civil rights activist
 Paul Nelson – magazine editor and music critic
 Carl Panzram – serial killer, was born south of the city in rural Polk County but his connection to Warren is unknown
 Val Johnson – former sheriff's deputy known for his UFO encounter

References

Further reading
 Solum, Nancy, ed.  Self-Portrait of Marshall County: A History of One Minnesota County and Many People Who Made That History.  Dallas: Taylor, 1976.
 Stevens, Charles L.  Warren and Vicinity in the Eighties: Some Recollections of Happenings in This Section Nearly Fifty Years Ago.  Warren, Minn.: Warren Register, 1928.
 Warren, Plains to Plenty: A Story of 75 Eventful Years, Warren, Minn: Sheaf Printing, 1956.

External links
 City of Warren
 Marshall County Fair
 City-data.com -- demographic website -- INCLUDES SATELLITE PHOTO - Link

Cities in Marshall County, Minnesota
Cities in Minnesota
County seats in Minnesota
1879 establishments in Minnesota